The 2006 Oceania Handball Championship was the fifth edition of the Oceania Handball Nations Cup, which took place in Sydney, Australia from 22 to 24 May 2006. Entered nations were Australia, Cook Islands and New Zealand. Australia won the right to play in the 2007 World Men's Handball Championship in Germany.

Table

Results
All times are local (UTC+10).

References

External links
Report on Tudor Handball

Oceania Handball Nations Cup
2006 Oceania Handball Nations Cup
Oceania Handball Championship
2006 in Australian sport
Sports competitions in Sydney
May 2006 sports events in Australia